The 2019–20 season is Indian Arrows' 6th competitive season in the top-flight of Indian football, I-league. Indian Arrows was formed in 2010 on the behest on then Indian team coach, Bob Houghton, with the main goal of nurturing young talent in India in the hope of qualifying for 2018 FIFA World Cup in Russia. It was disbanded by AIFF in 2013 when their club sponsor, Pailan Group, could not financially support the group. But revived again in 2017-18 season immediately after FIFA U-17 World Cup.

Technical staff

Squad
{|class="wikitable" style="text-align:center; font-size:90%; width:80%;"
|-
!style="background:#034694; color:white; text-align:center;"|No.
!style="background:#034694; color:white; text-align:center;"|Name
!style="background:#034694; color:white; text-align:center;"|Nationality
!style="background:#034694; color:white; text-align:center;"|Date of Birth (Age)
|-
!colspan=5 text-align:center;"|Goalkeepers
|-
|1
|Lalbiakhlua Jongte
|
|
|-
|13
|Samik Mitra
|
|
|-
|22
|Tamal Naskar
|
|
|-
!colspan=5 text-align:center;"|Defenders
|-
|2
|Ajin Tom
|
|
|-
|3
|Harpreet Singh
|
|
|-
|4
|Akash Mishra
|
|
|-
|5
|Hendry Antonay
|
|
|-
|12
|Saurabh Meher
|
|
|-
|15
|Joseph Lalsangluara
|
|
|-
|16
|Bikash Yumnam
|
|
|-
|20
|Ruivah Hormipam
|
|
|-
|26
|Gurkirat Singh
|
|
|-
|30
|Surya Tirkey
|
|
|-
!colspan=5 text-align:center;"|Midfielders
|-
|6
|Vikram Pratap Singh
|
|
|-
|10
|Givson Singh
|
|
|-
|14
|Ricky John Shabong
|
|
|-
|21
|Telem Suranjit Singh
|
|
|-
|27
|Ayush Adhikari
|
|
|-
|31
|Lalliansangla Renthlei
|
|
|-
!colspan=5 text-align:center;"|Forwards
|-
|7
|Gurkirat Singh
|
|
|-
|9
|Aman Chetri
|
|
|-
|11
|Rohmingthanga Bawlte
|
|
|-
|17
|Harmanpreet Singh
|
|
|-
|19
|Lalchhanhmia Sailo
|
|
|-
|26
| Manvir Singh
|
|
|-
|34
|Suraj Rawat
|
|
|-

Competitions

Overview

I-League

League table

Results & Schedule

Statistics

Goal Scorers

References

Indian Arrows FC seasons
2019–20 I-League by team